Loncon is the name given to three Worldcon (science fiction) conventions held in London, England.

 Loncon I, 1957
 Loncon II, 1965
 Loncon 3, 2014

Other
 Lonçon, a commune in the Pyrénées-Atlantiques department of France